Pseudotessellarctia ursina is a moth in the family Erebidae. It was described by Schaus in 1892. It is found in Brazil.

References

Natural History Museum Lepidoptera generic names catalog

Moths described in 1892
Phaegopterina
Arctiinae of South America